Isobutyraldehyde is the chemical compound with the formula (CH3)2CHCHO. It is an aldehyde, isomeric with n-butyraldehyde (butanal). Isobutyraldehyde is made, often as a side-product, by the hydroformylation of propene. Its odour is described as that of wet cereal or straw. It undergoes the Cannizaro reaction even though it has alpha hydrogen atom. It is a colorless volatile liquid.

Synthesis
Isobutyraldehyde is produced industrially by the hydroformylation of propene. Several million tons are produced annually.

Biological routes
In the context of butanol fuel, isobutyraldehyde is of interest as a precursor to isobutanol. E. coli as well as several other organisms has been genetically modified to produce isobutanol. α-Ketoisovalerate, derived from oxidative deamination of valine, is prone to decarboxylation to give isobutyraldehyde, which is susceptible to reduction to the alcohol:
(CH3)2CHC(O)CO2H  →  (CH3)2CHCHO  +  CO2
(CH3)2CHCHO  +  NADH  +  H+  →  (CH3)2CHCH2OH  +  NAD+

Other routes
It can also be produced using engineered bacteria.  

Strong mineral acids catalyse the rearrangement of methallyl alcohol to isobutyraldehyde.

Reactions
Hydrogenation of the aldehyde gives isobutanol. Oxidation gives methacrolein or methacrylic acid. Condensation with formaldehyde gives hydroxypivaldehyde.

References

Flavors
Aldehydes